Abdul Rahman Antulay (9 February 1929 – 2 December 2014) was an Indian politician. Antulay was a union minister for Minority Affairs and a Member of Parliament in the 14th Lok Sabha of India.  Earlier he had been the Chief Minister of the state of Maharashtra, but was forced to resign after being convicted by the Bombay High Court on charges that he had extorted money for a trust fund he managed.

Antulay belonged to the Congress party. In the 2009 Indian general elections, he lost to Anant Geete from the Raigad Lok Sabha constituency of Maharashtra. He is the first Muslim chief minister of Maharashtra.

Life
He was born in Konkani Muslim Family to father Shri Hafiz Abdul Gafoor and mother Zohrabi in the village Ambet village, near Mahad Raigad, Maharashtra, India. He was married to Nargis Antulay and the couple have one son and three daughters. After appearing for B.A. examination, he studied Barrister-At -Law, educated at Bombay University and Lincoln's Inn, London.

Antulay was a member of the Maharashtra Legislative Assembly from 1962 to 1976, during which time he served in the Maharashtra state government as Minister of State for Law and Judiciary, Ports and Fisheries and then as Minister of Law & Judiciary, Building, Communication and Housing from October 1969 to February 1976. He was a member of the Rajya Sabha from 1976 to 1980; in 1980, he was again elected to the Maharashtra Legislative Assembly and served as Chief Minister of Maharashtra from June 1980 to January 1982. He was forced to resign his post after allegations of corruption and a conviction in an extortion case. He again got elected in 1985 election to the Maharashtra Legislative Assembly and remained until 1989, when he was elected to the 9th Lok Sabha. He was re-elected to the 10th Lok Sabha in 1991. From June 1995 to May 1996, he was Union Minister of Health and Family Welfare, and from February to May 1996 he was additionally in charge of Water Resources. In 1996 he was re-elected to the 11th Lok Sabha, and in 2004 he was elected to the 14th Lok Sabha. He was Union Minister for Ministry of Minority Affairs (India) under Manmohan Singh's government.

He started his career as active social worker in 1945. As a social worker his notable achievements include construction of (i) a jetty on the bank of Savitri River, Bankot (Khadi) Creek through local people offering free labor (shramdan in Marathi) to complete the task. He also worked with his own hands along with the villagers of Ambet; (ii) road between the village Ambet and Lonere Goregaon (then in Kolaba, now in Raigad district) to connect his village to NH-17. He had a keen interest in the uplifting of  the weaker sections of the society and as the Chief Minister of Maharashtra had launched Sanjay Gandhi Niradhar Yojana (a monthly financial aid scheme for poor and destitute), pension and housing facilities for legislators and media persons, and many more initiatives. He had also announced that he would get back the Bhawani sword — the sword used by iconic Maratha king Shivaji which now lies in the British Museum in London.

He had to resign from the post of Chief Minister of Maharashtra due to allegations of his involvement in corruption. However, the Supreme Court cleared him of all allegations years later. The charges were seen as political ploy to malign him and arrest his political growth. When cleared by the Supreme Court, he said "I had done nothing wrong. I was targeted by political rivals but they failed. I suffered some setbacks, but they could not destroy me."  

Antulay died from chronic Kidney failure on 2 December 2014 while being treated at the Breach Candy Hospital in Mumbai.

Upon Antulay's demise, noted criminal lawyer J.P. Mishra, who represented Bharatiya Janata Party leader Ramdas Nayak in the corruption cases he had filed against Antulay, paid rich tributes to his old adversary. He acknowledged Antulay as "an administrator par excellence", whose heart always beat for the poor and downtrodden. "He was a truly great human being. He set up the trusts for the benefit of the poorest people in society, but they became his undoing. Even during the trial, he was always amiable and soft-spoken, never harbouring animosity or ill-will against anybody," said Mishra, who is now the BJP North Mumbai unit president of the BJP.

Literary works
He has also published several books:
 Parliamentary Privilege (compilation of his five articles published in the Times of India) ;
 Mahajan Report - Uncovered;
 Appointment of a Chief Justice;
 Democracy- Parliamentary or Presidential? (compilation of his speeches and interviews).

Controversies 

He resigned as Chief Minister of Maharashtra after the Bombay High Court convicted him of extortion on 13 January 1982. The court ruled that Antulay had illegally required Bombay area builders to make donations to Indira Gandhi Pratibha Pratishthan trust, one of several trust funds he had established and controlled, in exchange for receiving more cement than the quota allotted to them by the Government. He was later granted bail by the court. However, the Supreme Court later cleared him of the allegations.

Again after November 2008 Mumbai attacks he has raised a controversy by saying that the end of Hemant Karkare, of the Anti-Terrorism Squad of Maharashtra, killed in the attacks, may be related to his investigation of the 2006 Malegaon blasts, leading to questions about the Mumbai attacks. Later he changed his stand and told Parliament he had not talked about who killed the police officers but about who "sent them in the wrong direction". His party, Congress, distanced itself from his statements. The then US ambassador, in some of the US embassy cables, accused that this early dismissal, then followed by tacit promotion, indicates that "the Congress Party will readily stoop to the old caste/religious-based politics if it feels it is in its interest."

References

1929 births
2014 deaths
People from Raigad district
Indian National Congress politicians from Maharashtra
Chief Ministers of Maharashtra
Maharashtra MLAs 1962–1967
Maharashtra MLAs 1985–1990
India MPs 1989–1991
India MPs 1991–1996
India MPs 1996–1997
India MPs 2004–2009
Maharashtra MLAs 1980–1985
Rajya Sabha members from Maharashtra
Lok Sabha members from Maharashtra
Chief ministers from Indian National Congress
Health ministers of India
Ministers of Minority Affairs
Members of the Cabinet of India
Indian politicians convicted of crimes